Carapelle Calvisio is a comune and town in the province of L'Aquila in the Abruzzo region of central Italy. It is mostly known as being one of the smallest non-alpine comunes in Italy, with 85 inhabitants as of 31 December 2013. This town is also the smallest community in Abruzzo. It is located directly some kilometers from the historical castle Rocca Calascio.

Carapelle Calvisio's location (separated by a mountain from L'Aquila area) preserved it from serious damage in the April 2009 L'Aquila earthquake.

References

External links
 Pictures and news of Carapelle

Cities and towns in Abruzzo